Jaidip Mukerjea (born 21 April 1942) is a retired professional tennis player from India.

Personal life
Mukerjea is the grandson of Indian independence leader Chittaranjan Das.
He completed his schooling from La Martiniere Calcutta.

Tennis career

Juniors
Mukerjea won the Indian National Junior Championship in 1959. He then began to play overseas, and was the runner-up at the Wimbledon Boys' Singles tournament in 1960.

Amateur/Pro tour
Mukerjea's international breakout year came in 1962, when he made the fourth round of the U.S. Championships.  He reached the fourth round at Wimbledon in 1963 and 1964, and reached the fourth round at the French Championships in 1965.

1966 was Mukerjea's most successful year.  He again reached the fourth round at the French Championships and Wimbledon.  He was also a member of the India Davis Cup team that reached the final.  Mukerjea won India's only rubber in the final; he and Ramanathan Krishnan defeated John Newcombe and Tony Roche in doubles.  For his accomplishments, Mukerjea was given the Arjuna Award in 1966.

During his career, Mukerjea won at least 6 singles titles, including the Asian Championships three times.

After retirement
Mukerjea currently operates a Tennis Academy in Calcutta bearing his name, and he has served as tournament director for the Sunfeast Open, as well as Davis Cup Captain for India.

Singles titles

References

External links
 
 
 
 Jaidip Mukerjea Tennis Academy

1942 births
Living people
Indian male tennis players
Tennis players from Kolkata
Recipients of the Arjuna Award